Gymnasium №36 is a public school in Rostov-on-Don, Russia. Opened in 1915, the building was designed by architect I. Y. Lyubimov.

History
In 1906, State Councilor Nikolai Stepanov opened a four-year school for boys in Rostov-on-Don. Initially, it was located in the premises of the former orphanage, but several years later Stepanov decided to build a separate building for the gymnasium.  The new gymnasium building was built in 1915.  It initially accepted boys from ages 14 to 15.  The tuition fees for the preparatory class were 100 rubles, and for the first class, 130 rubles. From 1916, girls were accepted at the gymnasium.

The gymnasium was active during the Russian Civil War. In 1920, it was transformed into the first-level labour school No. 95. In 1922, on the basis of the elementary classes of school No. 95, the school of the first and second stage No. 24, named after Leon Trotsky, was opened. In 1926 this became the seven-year Trotsky School No. 5. In 1928 documents the educational institution was listed as Rostov-on-Don Co-Op-School No. 9. By 1938 it was called Maxim Gorky Secondary School No. 36. In 1962, school number 36 introduced the teaching of a number of subjects in English. In 1997 the school became Gymnasium No. 36.

In 2007, Gymnasium No. 36 was among the winners of the All-Russian Contest "The Best Schools in Russia".

Description 

The brick building of the school has three floors and a basement. The roof is four-tiered with a tent on the north-eastern side. The facade is of asymmetric brick decor. It has a complex configuration. The gymnasium's recreation hall is the compositional centre of the building. It is adjoined by stairs and classrooms.

On 1 September 2011 the Monument to the first-grader, depicting a schoolboy sitting on a globe, was unveiled at the entrance to the gymnasium.

References 

Tourist attractions in Rostov-on-Don
Gymnasiums in Russia
Buildings and structures in Rostov-on-Don
Education in Rostov-on-Don
Cultural heritage monuments in Rostov-on-Don
School buildings completed in 1915
Educational institutions established in 1915
Cultural heritage monuments of regional significance in Rostov Oblast